The Return of Art Pepper is an album by saxophonist Art Pepper featuring sessions from 1956 recorded for the Jazz: West label after his first release from prison. The album was rereleased on CD on Blue Note Records with bonus tracks as The Return of Art Pepper: The Complete Art Pepper Aladdin Recordings Volume 1 in 1988.

Reception

The AllMusic review by Stephen Thomas Erlewine observed: "Pepper's chops are a little rusty, but you can hear that he still has a passion for playing, and he does improve over the course of these tracks. For serious Pepper fans, it's worth a listen, but for less dedicated fans, there are better places to become acquainted with his work".

Track listing 
All compositions by Art Pepper, except where indicated.
 "Pepper Returns" - 4:26
 "Broadway" (Buddy DeSylva, Ray Henderson, Lew Brown) - 4:56 	
 "You Go to My Head" (J. Fred Coots, Haven Gillespie) - 4:15
 "Angel Wings" - 4:40
 "Funny Blues" - 4:36
 "Five More" - 4:37 	
 "Minority" - 4:17
 "Patricia" - 3:33
 "Mambo de la Pinta" - 4:15 	
 "Walkin' Out Blues" - 5:52

Personnel 
Art Pepper - alto saxophone
Jack Sheldon - trumpet (tracks 1, 2, 4-7, 9 & 10) 
Russ Freeman - piano
Leroy Vinnegar - bass 
Shelly Manne - drums

References 

1957 albums
Art Pepper albums
Blue Note Records albums

Albums recorded at Capitol Studios